The Toblacher See is a lake in the municipality of Toblach in South Tyrol, Italy.

External links

References 
Environment agency of South Tyrol 

Lakes of South Tyrol